Müzahir Sille (21 September 1931 – 17 May 2016) was a Turkish Olympic champion sports wrestler in the Featherweight class and a trainer. He won the gold medal in Men's Greco-Roman wrestling at the 1960 Olympics.

Born in Istanbul, he began 1949 sports wrestling in the "Istanbul Güreş Ihtisas Kulübü", a club specialized in wrestling. Competing in Greco-Roman style, Müzahir Sille became gold medalist in wrestling at the 1960 Summer Olympics after he won the silver medal twice at World championships and ranked 4th at the 1956 Summer Olympics.

He continued his wrestling career from 1961 on in the wrestling club KSV Witten 07 in Germany along with his teammate Mithat Bayrak, where he became regional champion. After his wrestling career ended, he returned to Istanbul to start several non-profit organizations mainly targeted towards helping the homeless. He lived in Istanbul with his wife, Dinani Sille until he died in 2016.

Achievements
 1955 World Championships in Karlsruhe, Germany - silver (Featherweight)
 1956 Olympics in Melbourne, Australia - 4th (Featherweight)
 1958 World Championships in Budapest, Hungary - silver (Featherweight)
 1959 Balkan Championships in Istanbul, Turkey - bronze (Featherweight)
 1960 Olympics in Rome, Italy - gold (Featherweight)
 1960 Olympics in Rome, Italy - silver (Featherweight)
 1960 Olympics in Rome, Italy - bronze (Featherweight)

References

External links
 

1931 births
2016 deaths
Sportspeople from Istanbul
Wrestlers at the 1956 Summer Olympics
Wrestlers at the 1960 Summer Olympics
Wrestlers at the 1964 Summer Olympics
Turkish male sport wrestlers
Olympic gold medalists for Turkey
Olympic medalists in wrestling
Medalists at the 1960 Summer Olympics
20th-century Turkish people